Ange-Gardien is a municipality in the Canadian province of Quebec, located within the Rouville Regional County Municipality in the province's Montérégie region. The population as of the 2016 Canadian Census was 2,699.

It was constituted on December 31, 1997, by the amalgamation of the village municipality of L'Ange-Gardien and the parish municipality of Saint-Ange-Gardien; the former is not to be confused with two other present-day municipalities in Quebec called "L'Ange-Gardien".

Demographics

Population
Population trend:

(+) Amalgamation of the Parish of Saint-Ange-Gardien and the Village of L'Ange-Gardien on December 31, 1997.

Language
Mother tongue language (2016)

See also
List of municipalities in Quebec
Municipal history of Quebec

References

External links

Municipalities in Quebec
Incorporated places in Rouville Regional County Municipality